Siona Tagger (also spelled Sionah Tagger) (born August 17, 1900, died June 16, 1988) was an Israeli painter, known for her paintings of the life in early 20th century Land of Israel and the Yishuv. In 1925, she became the first female member of the Hebrew Artists Association, and is often considered "the most important female Israeli artist of the early decades of the 20th century."

Biography 
Siona Tagger was born in Jaffa to Shmuel and Sultana Tagger. She studied art at Bezalel Academy of Arts and Design, after which she moved to Paris to continue her art studies. Her son, Avraham Katz-Oz was a Knesset Member and Israel's Minister of Agriculture.

Artistic career 
Tagger's paintings of the people and landscapes of Eretz Yisrael in watercolors and oil were displayed in several museums and galleries. In the 1960s, she added a collection of stained glass of biblical themes.

In 1977, Tagger was named Yakir of the City of Tel Aviv-Yafo for her lifelong contribution to the arts in the city, and a street was named after her.

See also
Visual arts in Israel
Ziona Tagger's wok "Celebration at Jaffa" sold for $43,700 at Tiroche auction house, January 30, 2010

References

External links 
 Siona Tagger – The first Israeli female painter
 Siona Tagger at the Hecht Museum

1900 births
1988 deaths
Jewish Israeli artists
Jewish painters
Israeli people of Bulgarian-Jewish descent
Israeli women painters
Israeli portrait painters
20th-century Israeli women artists
Burials at Nahalat Yitzhak Cemetery